Juan René Abarca Fuentes (born December 7, 1988) is a Chilean footballer who currently plays for Primera B side Rangers as a centre back.

In January 2012 he was on trial at Dutch side FC Twente but was not offered a contract.

Honours

Club
Universidad de Chile
Primera División de Chile (2): 2011 Apertura, 2011–C
Copa Sudamericana (1): 2011

International
Chile
Toulon Tournament (1): 2009

References

External links
 
 
 

 

1988 births
Living people
People from Cachapoal Province
Chilean footballers
Chile youth international footballers
Chile international footballers
Chilean expatriate footballers
Tercera División players
Chilean Primera División players
Primera B de Chile players
Liga de Expansión MX players
Segunda División Profesional de Chile players
Villarreal CF C players
C.D. Huachipato footballers
Universidad de Chile footballers
Cobreloa footballers
Santiago Wanderers footballers
San Marcos de Arica footballers
Deportes Iberia footballers
Atlante F.C. footballers
San Luis de Quillota footballers
Rangers de Talca footballers
Universidad de Concepción footballers
General Velásquez footballers
Expatriate footballers in Spain
Chilean expatriate sportspeople in Spain
Expatriate footballers in Mexico
Chilean expatriate sportspeople in Mexico
Association football defenders